Pagan Altar is an English doom metal band formed by Terry Jones and his son Alan in 1978 in the borough of Brockley in London.

History 
Alongside Witchfinder General, they are one of the few new wave of British heavy metal (NWOBHM) bands to play doom metal. The band's concerts are characterised by moody, epic and heavy music, blended with stage effects which accentuate their interest in occult themes.

Pagan Altar's only release from the NWOBHM era was an independent, self-released, self-titled demo album (which was heavily bootlegged in later years). The album would be re-released as an official full-length on Oracle Records in 1998, retitled "Volume 1".

The group reformed in 2004 to re-record an album of previously unreleased material which had been written during their original tenure as a band. The resulting album, "Lords of Hypocrisy", met with a positive reception from fans, and a third full-length album duly followed in 2006, entitled "Mythical and Magical".

In 2008, Pagan Altar co-headlined the "Metal Brew" Festival in Mill Hill, alongside Cloven Hoof. Both bands also performed at the "British Steel IV" Festival at the Camden Underworld in 2009. Pagan Altar returned to headline the "British Steel V" Festival in April 2011 and the "Live Evil" Festival in October 2011.

In 2012, Pagan Altar began work on their next album "Never Quite Dead", in a purpose-built recording studio in the back garden of vocalist Terry Jones's home. The 2013 lineup included: Dean Alexander on drums, Vinny Konrad (Vince Hempstead) on 2nd guitar, and William Gallagher on bass guitar.

On 15 May 2015, vocalist Terry Jones died of cancer. The band had finished recording their upcoming album, which was in its final mastering stage. In 2017, Alan Jones announced that he intends to partially re-record the band's upcoming album as neither he nor the late Terry Jones were happy with the finished product.

Discography

Albums 
 Judgement of the Dead (1982)
 Lords of Hypocrisy (2004)
 Mythical and Magical (2006)
 Room of Shadows (2017)
 The Story of Pagan Altar (2021)

EP 
 The Time Lord (2004, re-released as a special edition in 2012)

Singles 
 Pagan Altar – "Walking in the Dark" / Jex Thoth – "Stone Evil" (Split single, 2007)
 Pagan Altar – "Portrait of Dorian Gray" / "Mirror of Deception" – "Beltaine's Joy" (Imperial Anthems split single, 2011)
 "Walking in the Dark" / "Narcissus" (2013)

Demo 
 Pagan Altar (1982)

See also 
List of new wave of British heavy metal bands

References

External links 
Official website

English doom metal musical groups
Musical groups established in 1978
Musical groups disestablished in 1985
Musical groups reestablished in 2004
Musical groups from the London Borough of Lewisham
Occult rock musical groups
New Wave of British Heavy Metal musical groups
Black Widow Records artists